Clathromangelia strigilata is a species of sea snail, a marine gastropod mollusk in the family Raphitomidae.

Description
The white, slightly translucent fusiform shell has convex whorls with prominent, longitudinal costae about the whole length and sloping, equidistant striae. The shell grows to a length of 4 mm to 5 mm. The oblong aperture is somewhat rounded and its length is slightly less than the total length of the shell. The siphonal canal is wide open. The columella is slightly inclined to the left. The outer lip is not dentate and is inclined inwards with below a shallow anal sinus.

Distribution
This species is found in the Mediterranean Sea in the Gulf of Gabès, Tunisia.

References

 Pallary, P., 1904. Addition à la faune malacologique du golfe de Gabès. Journal de Conchyliologie 52: 212–248
 Fischer-Piette, E., 1950. Liste des types décrits dans le Journal de Conchyliologie et conservés dans la collection de ce journal (avec planches)(suite). Journal de Conchyliologie 90: 149–180
 Gofas, S.; Le Renard, J.; Bouchet, P. (2001). Mollusca, in: Costello, M.J. et al. (Ed.) (2001). European register of marine species: a check-list of the marine species in Europe and a bibliography of guides to their identification. Collection Patrimoines Naturels, 50: pp. 180–213
 Oliverio M., 1995: The systematics of the radula-less gastropod Clathromangelia (Caenogastropoda, Conoidea); Zoologica Scripta 24(3): 193–201

External links
 
  Bouchet P., Kantor Yu.I., Sysoev A. & Puillandre N. (2011) A new operational classification of the Conoidea. Journal of Molluscan Studies 77: 273–308
 MNHN, Paris: specimen

strigilata